Robert Paul Crockett (born April 3, 1943) is a former American football wide receiver in the American Football League (AFL) with the Buffalo Bills in 1966, and also in 1968 and 1969.

He was born in Briggsville, Arkansas and played high school football at Dermott (Arkansas) High School. He played college football for the University of Arkansas from 1962 to 1965.

He was selected in the 10th round (the 90th pick overall by the Bills in the 1966 AFL Draft and also by the National Football League (NFL)'s New York Giants in the 19th round (the 282nd overall pick) in the 1966 NFL Draft, electing to sign with the Bills.

Crockett was a teammate of Bobby Burnett with both the Arkansas Razorbacks and the Buffalo Bills.

See also
 List of American Football League players

References

1943 births
American football wide receivers
Buffalo Bills players
Arkansas Razorbacks football players
Sportspeople from Arkansas
People from Yell County, Arkansas
American Football League players
Living people